Marasmius bulliardii is a species of agaric fungus in the family Marasmiaceae. It was first described scientifically by French mycologist Lucien Quélet in 1878.

See also
List of Marasmius species

References

External links

bulliardii
Fungi described in 1878
Fungi of Europe